Jeannette, sometimes "Nanette", Papin, née Chodowiecka (1761–1835) was a German painter.

Jeannette Chodowiecka was a daughter of Jeanne Barez and her husband Daniel Chodowiecki. Papin was born in Berlin, moving to Frankfurt an der Oder after her marriage to a member of the clergy. She sent pastels from there to the Academy of Arts in her hometown beginning in 1788. Exhibited under the section for dilettantes, they included genre works and copies after other artists. Her work received favorable critical attention. Her sisters Suzanne and Henriette were painters, as were her daughter Marianne Chodowiecka Papin and son Heinrich Papin.

References

1761 births
1835 deaths
18th-century German painters
18th-century German women artists
19th-century German painters
19th-century German women artists
German women painters
German watercolourists
Women watercolorists
Pastel artists
Artists from Berlin
German people of Polish descent